Marcel Gaillard (17 November 1923 – 2 January 2007) was a French footballer who played for RC Strasbourg, OGC Nice and US Valenciennes-Anzin. Gaillard won the 1951 French Championship with Nice, and participated in the Coupe de France Final 1951 with Valenciennes.

References

General
 Les Cahiers de l'Équipe 1957, page 129.

Specific

1923 births
2007 deaths
Association football defenders
French footballers
Ligue 1 players
OGC Nice players
People from Nanterre
RC Strasbourg Alsace players
Footballers from Hauts-de-Seine
Valenciennes FC players